Pipe Dream is the thirteenth studio album by Australian country music artist John Williamson. The album was released in August 1997, peaked at number 6 on the ARIA Charts and was certified platinum.

At the Country Music Awards of Australia in January 1998, the album won 'Top Selling Album'.

Track listing

Charts

Weekly charts

Year-end charts

Certifications

Release history

References

1997 albums
John Williamson (singer) albums
EMI Records albums